Harrigan Cove is a rural community on the Eastern Shore of Nova Scotia, Canada, in the Halifax Regional Municipality. The community is located in the vicinity the cove of the same name and is named for an early settler who came to the area after 1827.

History 
Harrigan Cove was once known for gold mines, after it was discovered there in 1868. However, the gold mining industry did not really take off until the early 20th century.

Nearby places

References

Citations

Bibliography

Communities in Halifax, Nova Scotia
General Service Areas in Nova Scotia